Andrei Nikitenko (born January 13, 1979) is a Russian former professional ice hockey forward who concluded his nineteen-year professional career as Captain of HC Lada Togliatti in the 2015–16 season of the then Kontinental Hockey League (KHL).

External links

1979 births
Living people
Admiral Vladivostok players
Ak Bars Kazan players
HC CSKA Moscow players
HC Lada Togliatti players
Metallurg Novokuznetsk players
People from Tyumen
Severstal Cherepovets players
HC Sibir Novosibirsk players
Torpedo Nizhny Novgorod players
Russian ice hockey forwards
Sportspeople from Tyumen Oblast